Aliyu Ibrahim is a Nigerian professional footballer, who plays as a forward for Nasarawa United F.C.

International career
In January 2014, coach Stephen Keshi, invited him to be included in the Nigeria 23-man team for the 2014 African Nations Championship. He helped the team to a third-place finish after Nigeria beat Zimbabwe 1-0.

References

Living people
Nigeria A' international footballers
2014 African Nations Championship players
Nigerian footballers
Place of birth missing (living people)
Association football forwards
Year of birth missing (living people)
People from Owerri
Sportspeople from Imo State
Nasarawa United F.C. players